Vasyl Vasylovych Petiovka (born 30 January 1967) is a Ukrainian politician currently serving as a People's Deputy of Ukraine since 12 December 2012.

Early life and career
Vasyl Petiovka was born on 30 January 1967, in the village of Zavydovo, within what was then the Ukrainian Soviet Socialist Republic. In 1985 he graduated from Mukachevo cooperative technical school on specialty:  stock manager and sales manager of groceries and industrial goods. From 1985 to 1987 he had a compulsory military service. He got education at Mukachevo Technological Institute at the Faculty of Engineering and Economics. In 2006 he graduated from Odesa I. I. Mechnikov National University, got a specialty: a specialist in accounting and audit.

From 1985, Petiovka worked at Verhniokoropetz consumers enterprise of Mukachevo Region consumer's association. After 1987, he worked at Mukachevo cooperative technical school, the Latorytzia company, and Rei-Promin LLC. From April 1997, he worked at Barva LLC, becoming head of the board of directors in  April 1998.

Political career
In 2002, he was elected a deputy of the 4th convocation of the Zakarpattia Oblast Council. From 2002 to 2003, he served as a member of the executive Mukachevo City Council of Zakarpattia Oblast. From 2003 to 2007 he was mayor of Mukachevo. His 2003 election was followed by a long legal battle with Ernest Nuser, who had also claimed victory in the election and was supported by the Social Democratic Party of Ukraine (united).

In the 2006 Ukrainian parliamentary election, Petiovka was a candidate for People's Deputy of Ukraine from Our Ukraine Bloc (NUNS), as No. 224 on the party list, but was unsuccessful. In the 2007 Ukrainian parliamentary election, he ran again as a member of NUNS, this time as No. 60 on the party list. This time, Petiovka was successfully elected, and served as a member of the Verkhovna Rada Financial Committee.

In the 2012 Ukrainian parliamentary election, he was re-elected as a People's Deputy, this time in Ukraine's 72nd electoral district as a candidate of United Centre. In the 2014 Ukrainian parliamentary election, he was re-elected as deputy from the 72nd electoral district, and joined the People’s Will group. As a consequence, he was expelled from United Centre.

Vasyl Petiovka is a member of the Committee of the Verkhovna Rada on agricultural policy and land matters. He is also a member of the interparliamentary committee with South Korea. In the 2019 Ukrainian parliamentary election he was re-elected as an independent candidate from the 72nd electoral district, and became a member of Dovira.

Petiovka and three other Dovira faction members (Valerii Lunchenko, Robert Khorvat and Vladislav Poliak) developed the local Zakarpattia Oblast party Native Zakarpattia. This part won 12 of the 64 seats in the Zakarpattia Oblast Council during the 2020 Ukrainian local elections.

Family
Petiovka has a wife, named Maryna, and two sons. He is a cousin of Viktor Baloha, who is also a member of the Verkhovna Rada.

Awards
Order of Merit (Ukraine) 3rd Class (08.2005)
Order of Merit (Ukraine) 2rd Class (07.2012)
Order of Ukrainian Orthodox Church of Patriarchate of Moscow of Knight Volodymyr

References

External links
 Verkhovna Rada of Ukraine, official web portal

1967 births
Living people
People from Zakarpattia Oblast
Odesa University alumni
Mayors of places in Ukraine
Our Ukraine (political party) politicians
United Centre politicians
Governors of Zakarpattia Oblast
Sixth convocation members of the Verkhovna Rada
Seventh convocation members of the Verkhovna Rada
Eighth convocation members of the Verkhovna Rada
Ninth convocation members of the Verkhovna Rada
Recipients of the Order of Merit (Ukraine), 3rd class
Recipients of the Order of Merit (Ukraine), 2nd class